= Russia, Bolshevism, and the Versailles Peace =

- Author: John M. Thompson
- Subject: History of the Paris Peace Conference
- Published: 1966 (Princeton University Press)

Russia, Bolshevism, and the Versailles Peace is a book by the American historian John M. Thompson (1926–2017) that discusses the impact of events in Russia on the activities of the Paris Peace Conference of 1919—1920; the work was first published by Princeton University Press in 1966.
